Paras Kalnawat (born 9 November 1996)  is an Indian model and actor best known for portraying Sanjay Singh Ahlawat in Meri Durga, Faraz Sheikh in Ishq Aaj Kal and Samar Shah in Anupamaa.

Early life
Kalnawat belonging to a Brahmin family was born to a Nagpur-based businessman Bhushan Kalnawat and Anita Kalnawat on 9 November 1996 at Bhandara, a district near Nagpur and has an elder sister named Pragati Kalnawat Sharma also. He completed his schooling from a local school in Nagpur and later joined S.K. Somaiya College of Arts, Science and Commerce to earn his Bachelor of Commerce degree. Later he moved to Mumbai to become an actor and completed his dance diploma from Terence Lewis Dance Academy and took formal training in acting from Barry John's Acting Classes.

Personal life
In 2021, Kalnawat revealed that he is in a serious relationship with someone outside the entertainment industry. On 27 March 2021, while shooting for Holi sequence in Anupamaa, he got the news of his father's sudden demise due to heart attack.

In November 2022, he revealed about him being diagnosed with Spondylitis during his stint on Jhalak Dikhhla Jaa 10.

Career

Modelling, debut and early success (2016-2020)
Kalnawat begun his career with modelling in 2016 and later started his acting career in 2017 by appearing in an episodic role as Dhruv in Aye Zindagi. In July 2017 he made his television debut opposite Srishti Jain in StarPlus's Meri Durga where he portrayed lead role of Sanjay Singh Ahlawat until the show went off-air in March 2018. In May 2018, he was cast to play Rehaan Thakur opposite Priyanka Kandwal in Mariam Khan - Reporting Live by the same channel Star Plus. However the duo quit the show in September 2018 due to some personal reasons.

Later in the same year he portrayed episodic roles in Kaun Hai? and Laal Ishq. In 2019, he made his digital debut by portraying Shivam Noon in ALT Balaji's Dil Hi Toh Hai 2 opposite Palak Purswani. He went on to play Antihero Faraz Sheikh in all four seasons of the web series Ishq Aaj Kal opposite Ankitta Sharma in the same year and reprised his role as Shivam in Dil Hi Toh Hai 3 opposite Poulomi Das in early 2020.

Breakthrough through Anupamaa, fallout and Jhalak Dikhhla Jaa 10 (2020-present)
In March 2020, Kalnawat signed to portray the role of a dancer Samar Shah in Anupamaa opposite Anagha Bhosale and Alma Hussein. It turned out to be a turning point in his career as he became a household name as Samar due to show's immediate success.

He subsequently appeared in music videos like Tere Naal Rehna, Akhaa Vich, Khumariyaan, Yaar Ki Mehfil, Baadal Barse, etc.

In July 2022, Kalnawat announced his participation in dance-based reality show Jhalak Dikhhla Jaa 10. However it led to the termination of his three-years-long contract by Anupamaa's producer Rajan Shahi and he termed the actor "unprofessional" as the show was scheduled to air on rival channel Colors TV. To his defense Kalnawat claimed that "he already informed the makers about the same to which they asked him to choose between Anupamaa and Jhalak in return and he chose the latter for his career growth claiming his ouster to be a "PR Tactic" supporting his former co-actor Anagha Bhosale's allegations of "set politics" on makers and signed off calling whatever happened was a "nightmare" and "sigh of relief" and revealed many dark secrets of the production house including his return to show within five days of his father's demise as leads were tested COVID-19 positive. Subsequently, his intro promo was released by Colors TV on 7 August 2022. On beginning his reality journey through Jhalak, Kalnawat said, "I want audience to watch the first episode of Jhalak to know me better" and later confirmed  about pairing up with choreographer Shweta Sharda for the same. On 6 November 2022, he was eliminated in season's first double elimination, finishing at 10th place.

Since March 2023, he is portraying Rajveer Luthra opposite Sana Sayyad post generation leap in Zee TV's Kundali Bhagya.

Media
On Indian Independence Day 2022, he took an initiative for Clean India Campaign and asked his fans to join and support him for the same.

Apart from acting, Kalnawat is also known for his poetries.

Filmography

Television

Web series

Music videos

Awards and nominations

References

External links

Living people
Indian male models
Indian male television actors
1996 births